Santianes is one of fifteen parishes (administrative divisions) in Pravia, a municipality within the province and autonomous community of Asturias, in northern Spain.

The population is 631 (INE 2011).

Villages and hamlets

 Bances
 Los Cabos
 Santianes

References  

Parishes in Pravia